Achatinella lehuiensis is an extinct species of air-breathing land snail, a terrestrial pulmonate gastropod mollusk in the family Achatinellidae. This species was endemic to Oahu, Hawaii.

Subspecies
 Achatinella lehuiensis mienickei Pilsbry & Cooke, 1921

References

†lehuiensis
Extinct gastropods
Molluscs of Hawaii
Endemic fauna of Hawaii
Taxonomy articles created by Polbot
ESA endangered species